The Brooklyn Bronx & Queens Band is the debut album by the funk/R&B band B. B. & Q. Band, produced by band creator Jacques Fred Petrus. Its lead single, "On The Beat", was their best known hit song.

Track listing
 "On the Beat"
 "Time for Love"
 "Don't Say Goodbye"
 "Starlette"
 "Mistakes"
 "Lovin's What We Should Do"
 "I'll Cut You Loose"

Personnel
Bass - Paris Ford (credited as Peewee Ford)
Drums - Terry Silverlight
Guitar - Paolo Gianolio
Piano and synthesizers - Mauro Malavasi
Keyboards - Kevin Nance
Vocals - Ike Floyd

References

1981 debut albums
Rhythm and blues albums by American artists